The Canton of Ham is a canton situated in the department of the Somme and in the Hauts-de-France region of northern France.

Geography 
The canton is organised around the commune of Ham.

Composition
At the French canton reorganisation which came into effect in March 2015, the canton was expanded from 19 to 67 communes (7 of which were merged into the new communes Hypercourt, Hombleux and Marchélepot-Misery):

Ablaincourt-Pressoir
Assevillers
Athies
Belloy-en-Santerre
Berny-en-Santerre
Béthencourt-sur-Somme
Billancourt
Breuil
Brouchy
Buverchy
Chaulnes
Chuignes
Cizancourt
Croix-Moligneaux
Curchy
Dompierre-Becquincourt
Douilly
Ennemain
Épénancourt
Eppeville
Esmery-Hallon
Estrées-Deniécourt
Falvy
Fay
Fontaine-lès-Cappy
Foucaucourt-en-Santerre
Framerville-Rainecourt
Fresnes-Mazancourt
Ham
Herleville
Hombleux
Hypercourt
Languevoisin-Quiquery
Licourt
Lihons
Marchélepot-Misery
Matigny
Mesnil-Saint-Nicaise
Monchy-Lagache
Morchain
Moyencourt
Muille-Villette
Nesle
Offoy
Pargny
Potte
Proyart
Punchy
Puzeaux
Quivières
Rethonvillers
Rouy-le-Grand
Rouy-le-Petit
Saint-Christ-Briost
Sancourt
Soyécourt
Tertry
Ugny-l'Équipée
Vauvillers
Vermandovillers
Villecourt
Voyennes
Y

Population

See also
 Arrondissements of the Somme department
 Cantons of the Somme department
 Communes of the Somme department

References

Ham